WHPO (100.9 FM) is a radio station broadcasting a country music format. Licensed to Hoopeston, Illinois, United States, the station serves Iroquois County, Vermillion County, and Ford County, Illinois as well as Benton County, and Warren County, Indiana. WHPO is currently owned by Hoopeston Radio Inc.

References

External links
 
 

HPO
Country radio stations in the United States